National Highway 919 (NH 919) is a  National Highway in India. It connects Palwal and Rewari in Haryana via Dharuhera and Sohna, all of which are in Haryana.

It merges with NH 48 (Delhi-Jaipur highway) at Dharuhera, and again separates as NH 919 after 3 km at Masani Barrage at Sahibi River.

Its former number was NH 71B before all the national highways were renumbered in the year 2010.

References

National highways in India
National Highways in Haryana